Royal Noble Consort Ahn of the Gyeongju Yi clan (Hangul: 안빈 이씨, Hanja: 安嬪 李氏; September 1622 – October 1693) was a Korean Royal Consort and the spouse of King Hyojong of Joseon.

Biography
Lady Yi was born in September 1622, lunar calendar, (14th year reign of Gwanghaegun of Joseon) as the daughter of Yi Eung-heon from the Gyeongju Yi clan. She became Hyojong's concubine when he was still Grand Prince Bongrim (봉림대군). 

When the Qing Invasion happened in 1636, Lady Yi, along with Princess Consort Pungan (the future Queen Inseon), followed Grand Prince Bongrim to Shenyang and assisted him as they went to China as hostages of the Qing Dynasty. After her death, King Sukjong, King Hyojong’s and Queen Inseon’s grandson, highly respected and honored Lady Yi for this act, and had her ancestral rights performed through his successors.

In 1649, Lady Yi gave birth to a daughter whom was given the title Princess Suknyeong (숙녕옹주, 淑寧翁主). Her daughter was known to be cherished by her father and her legal mother, Queen Inseon. 

There was an occasion in which the King and the Queen were giving gifts to their children. The King gave gifts only to the princesses as he was conscious of how the Queen would react without giving any present to the concubine's daughter. But the Queen, who was worried about excluding Lady Yi’s only daughter from her husband, personally called Princess Suknyeong with a gift.

There was a time when Lady Yi caused a great stir after calling her daughter, Princess Suknyeong, "you". At that time, it was customary for royal concubines to avoid using informal speech to the king's children, even if she was their biological mother since princes and princesses of blood were in higher rank than a royal concubine. When this became known, the King tried to punish the royal consort, but the Queen adamantly persuaded the King to let it pass. In this manner, it showed that the Queen truly cared for the royal consort and her subordinates.

In 1661, Lady Yi became Royal Consort Suk-ui (rank junior 2; 숙의, 淑儀), and was then promoted to So-ui (rank senior 2; 소의, 昭儀). Her 13-year-old daughter married in 1662 to a son from the Bannam Park clan, and the couple eventually had a daughter in 1667.

In 1666 or 1668, the royal consort’s daughter died; leaving her to outlive her 27 or 29 years.

Royal Consort So-ui was later promoted as Royal Consort Gwi-in (rank junior 1; 귀인, 貴人) in 1686. After that, Yi became Royal Noble Consort Ahn (rank senior 1; 안빈, 安嬪). 

In October 1698 (19th year reign of Sukjong of Joseon), the royal consort died at the age of 72 years old.

Her tomb was located in Songreung-ri, Jingeon-eup, Namyangju-si, Gyeonggi-do. Then, her tomb became historical site no. 366 on 25 October 1991.

Family 
 Father - Yi Eung-heon (이응헌, 李應憲)
 Husband - Yi Ho, King Hyojong of Joseon (효종 조선) (3 July 1619 - 23 June 1659)
 Mother-in-law - Queen Inyeol of the Cheongju Han clan (인열왕후 한씨) (16 May 1594 - 16 January 1636)
 Father-in-law - Yi Jung, King Injo of Joseon (인조 조선) (7 December 1595 - 17 June 1649)
 Issue
 Daughter - Princess Suknyeong (숙녕옹주) (1649 — 1666/1668)
 Son-in-law - Park Pil-seong, Prince Consort Geumpyeong (1652 - 1747) (박필성 금평위)
 Granddaughter - Park Hui-gyeong, Lady Park of the Bannam Park clan (1667 - ?) (박희경, 朴喜慶)
 Grandson-in-law - Yi Su-cheol (이수철, 李秀喆)

References

1622 births
1693 deaths
17th-century Korean people
Royal consorts of the Joseon dynasty